Linnahall ('Tallinn City Hall') (originally the V. I. Lenin Palace of Culture and Sports) is a multi-purpose venue in Tallinn, Estonia. It is situated in the harbor, just beyond the walls of the Old Town, and was completed in 1980. The venue also features a heliport and a small seaport.

Venue
The 1980 Summer Olympics were hosted in Moscow. As inland Moscow had no suitable venue at which to stage the sailing event, this task fell to Tallinn, the capital of the then Estonian SSR. Apart from the main venue for the sailing event, Pirita Yachting Centre, a number of other sports and entertainment facilities were erected, among them the V. I. Lenin Palace of Culture and Sport. designed by architects Raine Karp and Riina Altmäe.

The skating rink closed in 2009, followed by the concert hall in 2010. The city searched for investors from 2009 to 2015, and in 2015 the city council decided to renovate Linnahall, although the project did not come to fruition.

From June to July 2019, the location served as a stand-in for a Kyiv opera house during the filming of the feature film Tenet.

It is not to be confused with the primary administrative building of the historical municipal government (Raad) of Tallinn, often referred to as the Town Hall.

Noted performers

Savage Garden
Duran Duran
Emma Shapplin
Lou Reed
Bryan Ferry
Apocalyptica
Chris de Burgh
Scorpions
Alphaville
A-ha
Toto
Garbage
Kim Wilde
The Sugarcubes
Electric Light Orchestra
Uriah Heep
Celine Dion
Bonnie Tyler
The Manhattan Transfer
Jennifer Rush

Heliport

Linnahall Heliport , is a heliport at the Linnahall in Tallinn, Estonia. It was used by Copterline for its flights to Helsinki Hernesaari Heliport in Helsinki, Finland.  It is the only publicly used heliport in Estonia.

Gallery

References

External links

News Estonia: Linnahall Works Suddenly Stopped

Heliports in Estonia
Sports venues completed in 1980
Indoor ice hockey venues in Estonia
Sports venues built in the Soviet Union
Sports venues in Tallinn
Event venues established in 1980
1980 establishments in Estonia
Indoor arenas in Estonia